Ajas Pasha (? - Anatolia, 1486) was a Bosnian sanjak-bey and later pasha in Ottoman service.

Career
He was sanjak-bey of Bosnia, referred to as the Lord of the King's land, from 1470 to 1475, 1477 to 1478 and in 1483, and ruled sanjak-bey of Herzegovina, also referred to as Herzegovina's Krajisnik or Duke of the Herzeg's land, from 1478 to 1480 and 1481 to 1483. In 1472 he raided Croatian littoral, Istria and Friuli region. In November 1481 he besieged Herceg Novi, and on 14th December of 1481 he captured the city after Vlatko Hercegović gave up defending it and agreed surrender. For this he was awarded title of pasha.

Achievements
He played a key role in the development of Visoko from a Bosnian medieval type of town to Ottoman styled urban organization. He legalized his vakf in 1477 hammam,  shops, mekteb, water supply system, bridge on river Bosna, shadirvan, medrese and Nakshbandi tekija which he built in Visoko. He personally commissioned the building of all these structures and architecture.

See also
List of Ottoman governors of Bosnia

References  

Bosnia and Herzegovina generals
Ottoman generals
Ottoman Bosnian nobility
15th-century people from the Ottoman Empire
People from the Ottoman Empire of Bosnian descent
Bosniak history
15th-century Bosnian people
Ottoman governors of Bosnia
Sanjak of Herzegovina